Live at the Theatre Boulogne-Billancourt/Paris, Vol. 1 is an album by Mingus Dynasty, billed as Big Band Charlie Mingus.

Recording and music
Live at the Theatre Boulogne-Billancourt/Paris, Vol. 1 was recorded on June 8, 1988. The band was billed as Big Band Charlie Mingus, a larger version of Mingus Dynasty, which plays the music of Charles Mingus. The performances were conducted by Jimmy Knepper.

"Sy Johnson's arrangement of 'The Shoes of the Fishermans Wife Are Some Jive Ass Slippers' [...] builds from opening rubato horns through rocking, tumbling riffs to a solo piano interlude and tenor saxophone (Clifford Jordan and David Murray) solos in 4/4 and 3/4 slowly engulfed by rising ensemble backgrounds."

Releases
The album was released by Soul Note. It was later included, with Live at the Theatre Boulogne-Billancourt/Paris, Vol. 2 and other albums, in the CAM Jazz 4-CD compilation Mingus Dynasty Big Band Charlie Mingus.

Track listing
"Jump Monk"
"E's Flat Ah's Flat Too"
"Duke Ellington's Sound of Love"
"The Shoes of the Fisherman's Wife Are Some Jive Ass Slippers"
"Ecclusiastics"

Personnel
Nick Brignola – baritone sax, flute
Clifford Jordan – tenor sax, soprano sax
David Murray – tenor sax, bass clarinet
John Handy – alto sax
Randy Brecker – trumpet
Jon Faddis – cornet
Jimmy Knepper – trombone, conductor
Mike Zwerin – trombone
Jaki Byard – piano
Reggie Johnson – bass
Billy Hart – drums

References

1988 albums
Black Saint/Soul Note live albums
Charles Mingus tribute albums